, also known as , is a Japanese-born actor, dancer, choreographer and writer. He has resided in Italy since 1975 and holds Italian citizenship. 

Beginning his career as a mime, he has performed in and choreographed for numerous stage productions. Since 1976, he has acted in over 100 films and television series, including several 1980s genre films directed by the likes of Sergio Martino, Ruggero Deodato and Enzo G. Castellari. He is best known to international audiences for his villainous supporting roles in Wes Anderson's The Life Aquatic with Steve Zissou and The Wolverine. He has also translated and dubbed Japanese-language films into Italian.

Early life and education 
Yamanouchi was born in Tokyo. His grandfather, Akio Yamauchi, was a children's book writer. He grew up in Niigata Prefecture and graduated from Niigata High School and went on to study liberal arts at the Tokyo University of Foreign Studies. After graduation in 1971, he moved to London where he attended drama and dancing lessons. He was among the disciples of mime artist Lindsay Kemp.

Career

Theatre
While in London, he joined Stomu Yamashta's Red Buddha Theatre company, performing at the Roundhouse and the Piccadilly Theatre. He moved to Italy in 1975 and he began his career as an actor in experimental stage productions, appearing at pantomime festivals like the Festival Internazionale di mimo e pantomima in Florence and Settembre al Borgo in Campania. He was a regular guest on RAI programming, where he would demonstrate his various acts. He first gained recognition for his stage acting in a production of William Shakespeare's The Tempest where he played the role of Ariel in over 300 stagings and earned him a Premio Internazionale Guido d'Arezzo. 

As a choreographer, Yamanouchi specializes in opera, collaborating with directors like Mauro Bolognini, Andrea Camilleri, Giancarlo Cobelli, Glauco Mauri, Mario Missiroli, Giuliano Montaldo and Luca Ronconi. He choreographed a production of Turandot held at the Yoyogi National Gymnasium.

Film and television
Yamanouchi is made his screen acting debut with an uncredited role in the 1977 exploitation film Emanuelle and the Last Cannibals, directed by Joe D'Amato. He appeared in numerous erotic comedies and B-movies throughout the 1980s, including Crime at the Chinese Restaurant (1981), 2020 Texas Gladiators (1982), The Sword of the Barbarians (1982), 2019, After the Fall of New York (1983), Endgame (1983), Warriors of the Year 2072 (1984), Under the Chinese Restaurant (1987), Phantom of Death (1988). He was occasionally credited under the pseudonym Al Huang. 

More high-profile roles taken by Yamanouchi include starring in Adriano Celentano's musical Joan Lui (1985) and in Gabriele Salvatores's science-fiction film Nirvana (1997). He also appeared in several American productions, such as Stuart Gordon's Robot Jox (1990), Wes Anderson's The Life Aquatic with Steve Zissou (2004), Paul McGuigan's Push (2009) and Peter Weir's The Way Back (2010). He most notably portrayed the older Ichirō Yashida / Silver Samurai in The Wolverine (2013) (sharing the main antagonist's role with Ken Yamamura), starring opposite Hugh Jackman, Tao Okamoto and Hiroyuki Sanada and also dubbed over his own dialogue in the Italian-language version of the film.

Yamanouchi has translated and dubbed numerous Japanese-language films and television series into Italian and occasionally vice versa. He is the Italian voice actor of Ken Watanabe, also voiced Floyd Eaglesan in the Italian dubbed version of Despicable Me 2 (2013).

Teaching
Yamanouchi co-founded MDA Produzioni Danza, a dance and performing arts school in the Castelnuovo di Porto neighbourhood of Rome. He has also taught at the Silvio D'Amico National Academy of Dramatic Arts, Teatro dell'Opera di Roma and the Teatro Carlo Felice. He has also conducted numerous internships for mimes, dancers and actors for various associations, foundations and theater schools, on the themes of improvisation, spontaneous movements and acting with the kinesthetic approach.

Personal life
From his relationship with TG3 journalist Teresa Piazza, he has a son, Taiyo Yamanouchi, who is an actor and hip hop artist who performs under the stage name 'Hyst'. He has also served as a secondary father figure to Jesto, Taiyo's half-brother from Piazza's relationship with Stefano Rosso.

Yamanouchi has resided in Rome since emigrating to Italy in 1975. He became a naturalized citizen in 1992. He is fluent in Japanese, Italian and English and has performed in all three languages. He has penned a number of essays on Italian and Japanese culture for Italian literary magazines and has contributed to UNESCO's International Theatre Institute.

Filmography

Film
Fantozzi (1975)
Basta che non si sappia in giro (1976)
Emanuelle and the Last Cannibals (1977)
Gardenia (1979)
Saturday, Sunday and Friday (1979
The Humanoid (1979)
I'm Photogenic (1980)
The Last Hunter (1980)
Arrivano i gatti (1980)
Crime at the Chinese Restaurant (1981)
The Lady of the Camellias (1981)
2020 Texas Gladiators (1982)
Endgame (1983)
Sing Sing (1983)
Hearts and Armour (1983)
The Sword of the Barbarians (1983)
2019, After the Fall of New York (1983)
Warriors of the Year 2072 (1984)
Anche lei fumava il sigaro... (1985)
Nell'acqua (1985)
Joan Lui (1985)
Lone Runner (1986)
7 chili in 7 giorni (1986)
Under the Chinese Restaurant (1987)
Phantom of Death (1988)
Treno di panna (1988)
The Gamble (1988)
Sinbad of the Seven Seas (1989)
Robot Jox (1990)
Blue Dolphin - L'avventura continua (1990)
Un orso chiamato Arturo (1992)
Genghis Khan (1992) - Unfinished
Graffiante desiderio (1993)
La regina degli uomini pesce (1995)
Il tocco - La sfida (1996)
We Free Kings (1996)
Banzai (1997)
Nirvana (1997)
The Fish in Love (1999)
All the Moron's Men (1999)
Tutta la conoscenza del mondo (2001)
Last Food (2004)
Movimenti (2004)
The Life Aquatic with Steve Zissou (2004)
Tutte le donne della mia vita (2007)
This Night Is Still Ours (2008)
The Rage (2008)
Push (2009)
The Way Back (2010)
Tarda estate (2010)
Gorbaciof (2010)
All at Sea (2011)
Sins Expiation (2012)
The Day of the Siege: September Eleven 1683 (2012)
Niente può fermarci (2013)
The Mercury Factor (2013)
The Wolverine (2013)
The Girl from Nagasaki (2013)
Colpi di fortuna (2013)
A Boss in the Living Room (2014)
Ebola (2015)
Zoolander 2 (2016)
The Confessions (2016)
Al posto tuo (2016)
The Slider (2017)
Addio fottuti musi verdi (2017)
San Valentino Stories (2018)
La fuitina sbagliata (2018)
Hard Night Falling (2019) - Upcoming 
Yuki (TBA)

Television
Christopher Columbus (1985)
Atelier (1986)
I figli dell'ispettore (1986)
Treasure Island in Outer Space (1987)
Tutti in palestra (1987)
House of Lost Souls (1989)
Un inviato molto speciale (1992)
Italian Restaurant (1994)
The Fishmen and Their Queen (1995)
Don Matteo (2001)
La moglie cinese (2006)
L'ispettore Coliandro (2006)
Dove la trovi una come me? (2011)
Inspector Rex (2011-2014)
Street Fighter: Assassin's Fist (2014)
Il bosco (2015)
Strike Back (2015)
Zio Gianni (2016)
Squadra mobile (2017)

Dubbing roles

Animation
Floyd Eaglesan in Despicable Me 2

Live action
Lord Katsumoto Moritsugu in The Last Samurai
Ra's al Ghul's Decoy in Batman Begins
Mr. Saito in Inception
Dr. Ishirō Serizawa in Godzilla
Dr. Ishirō Serizawa in Godzilla: King of the Monsters
Hideo Yoshida in Pokémon: Detective Pikachu
Nobusuke Tagomi in The Man in the High Castle
Hara Jubei in Silk
Hard Master in G.I. Joe: The Rise of Cobra
General Shang in Arrival
Maezumi in The Ramen Girl
Mochitsura Hashimoto in USS Indianapolis: Men of Courage
Kakuro Ozu in The Hedgehog
Ichizo in Silence
Mr. Tatyama in Mamma Mia! Here We Go Again
Toru Iwatani in Pixels
Harry's adoptive father in Dumb and Dumber To
Mr. Musha in Speed Racer
Watari in Death Note

References

External links
 
 

1946 births
Living people
Academic staff of the Accademia Nazionale di Arte Drammatica Silvio D'Amico
Italian choreographers
Italian male dancers
Italian male film actors
Italian male stage actors
Italian male television actors
Italian male voice actors
Italian mimes
Italian people of Japanese descent
Italian stunt performers
Japanese choreographers
Japanese emigrants to Italy
Japanese male dancers
Japanese male film actors
Japanese male stage actors
Japanese male television actors
Japanese male voice actors
Japanese mimes
Japanese stunt performers
Male actors from Tokyo
Naturalised citizens of Italy
University of Tokyo alumni
20th-century Italian male actors
21st-century Italian male actors
20th-century Japanese male actors
21st-century Japanese male actors